Sun God Mountain is a  summit located in  British Columbia, Canada.

Description

Precipitation runoff from the mountain's north slope drains into Tenquille Creek, and from the south slope to Tenas Creek, which are both tributaries of the Birkenhead River.

History

The first ascent of the summit was made in 1931 by Preston L. Tait and John Ronayne, members of the Vancouver Natural History Society summer camp. The mountain was named by Mrs. Walter C. Green of Pemberton Meadows, on account of the golden radiance of the sun reflected off the reddish slopes. The mountain's toponym and location were officially adopted December 31, 1970, by the Geographical Names Board of Canada.

Climate
Based on the Köppen climate classification, Sun God is located in a subarctic climate zone of western North America. Most weather fronts originate in the Pacific Ocean, and travel east toward the Coast Mountains where they are forced upward by the range (Orographic lift), causing them to drop their moisture in the form of rain or snowfall. As a result, the Coast Mountains experience high precipitation, especially during the winter months in the form of snowfall. Winter temperatures can drop below −20 °C with wind chill factors below −30 °C. The months July through September offer the most favorable weather for climbing Sun God.

See also
 
 Geography of British Columbia

References

External links
 Weather: Sun God Mountain 

Two-thousanders of British Columbia
Pacific Ranges
Lillooet Land District
Coast Mountains
Pemberton Valley